Richard Olding Hynes FRS (born 29 November 1944) is a British biologist, a Howard Hughes Medical Institute Investigator, and the Daniel K. Ludwig Professor for Cancer Research at the Koch Institute for Integrative Cancer Research, Massachusetts Institute of Technology. His research focuses on cell adhesion and the interactions between cells and the extracellular matrix, with a particular interest in understanding molecular mechanisms of cancer metastasis. He is well known as a co-discoverer of fibronectin molecules, a discovery that has been listed by Thomson Reuters ScienceWatch as a Nobel Prize candidate.

Education
Hynes earned his B.A. in 1966 and M.A. in 1970 from the University of Cambridge, both in biochemistry. He received his Ph.D. in biology from the Massachusetts Institute of Technology in 1971. He worked as a postdoctoral fellow at the Imperial Cancer Research Fund from 1971 to 1974.

Academic career
Hynes became a faculty member in the biology department at MIT in 1973 and was promoted to full professor in 1983. He was awarded Howard Hughes Medical Institute Investigator status in 1988. He served as the head of the biology department from 1989 to 1991 and as the director of the MIT Center for Cancer Research from 1991 to 2001, and became the Daniel K. Ludwig Professor for Cancer Research and affiliated with the Koch Institute in 1999. Since 2004 he has been an associate member of the Broad Institute.

Hynes served as the president of the American Society for Cell Biology in 2000. He has been a member of the Board of Governors of the Wellcome Trust since 2007. He also served on the Life Sciences jury for the Infosys Prize in 2012.

He has also published on public policy and participated in the development of United States research guidelines for stem cell research, particularly embryonic stem cells.

Awards and honors
Hynes received a Guggenheim Fellowship in 1982. He was elected a fellow of the American Academy of Arts and Sciences in 1987, a Fellow of the Royal Society in 1989, a member of the Institute of Medicine in 1995, and a member of the United States National Academy of Sciences in 1996.

Hynes received the Gairdner Foundation International Award in 1997. In 2007, the American Society for Cell Biology awarded Hynes and Zena Werb their most prestigious award, the E.B. Wilson Medal. In 2022 he was awarded the Albert Lasker Award for Basic Medical Research.

References

British biologists
Fellows of the Royal Society
Massachusetts Institute of Technology School of Science faculty
Alumni of Trinity College, Cambridge
Living people
1944 births
Massachusetts Institute of Technology School of Science alumni
Howard Hughes Medical Investigators
Members of the United States National Academy of Sciences
Fellows of the AACR Academy
Members of the National Academy of Medicine
Recipients of the Albert Lasker Award for Basic Medical Research